Abdul Rashid Dar was a lawyer and politician from the state of Jammu & Kashmir, who served as MLA, MLC and later as the chairman of the Jammu and Kashmir Legislative Council.In his first election in 1987 Dar contested from the Shangus seat of Anantnag district, he won the election and was elected MLA as a member of the National Conference, representing the Shangus constituency of Anantanag .He served in the state assembly till the government was dismissed and the assembly was dissolved by Jagmohan the governor of Jammu and Kashmir. Later on in 1996 Dar was elected to the upper house the state Legislative council .

Legislative Council 
He was elected to the Jammu and Kashmir Legislative council in 1996 as a member, later on he was elected as the deputy chairman of the house serving for a brief period. Dar was subsequently elected as the chairman of upper house the Jammu and Kashmir Legislative council in 2001 a position he held for nearly a decade and while serving as the chairman, he ceased to be a member of the Jammu & Kashmir National Conference in 2004 Dar remained independent while also continuing to be the chairman of the Jammu and Kashmir Legislative Council.

No confidence motion 
In 2004 a No confidence motion was moved against Chairman Dar by the Jammu and Kashmir National conference the motion was introduced in the legislative council, the proceedings of the house were led by the deputy chairman Namgyal ,the voting was conducted and the motion failed to muster the required number of votes and Dar won the confidence of the house and continued his term as the chairman of the house till 2009. Dar died on 28 February 2020.

References 

Indian politicians
Jammu and Kashmir politicians
1949 births
2020 deaths